Alexander Dmitrievich Ogorodnik (November 11, 1939 – June 22, 1977) was a Soviet diplomat who, while stationed in Bogotá, was contacted by the Colombian Intelligence Agency and the U.S. Central Intelligence Agency to spy on the Soviet Union, operating under the code name TRIGON.

He initially showed little promise and claimed he knew only of Colombian political affairs. He was later transferred to the Soviet Foreign Ministry in Moscow. In this new position, he was able to photograph a great deal of secret diplomatic cables, many of which were sent daily to the White House.

Ogorodnik eventually requested a suicide pill to be used in the event that he was caught. His chief CIA handler in Bogota, KGB double agent Aldrich Ames, was able to supply him with one. However, Ogorodnik threw away the first pen containing the L-pill (lethal pill) and asked for the CIA to provide him with another pen. After much discussion in the CIA headquarters regarding this request, it was eventually approved and his Moscow handler, Martha Peterson, delivered the pen through a dead drop.

Ogorodnik was betrayed by Karl Koecher, a Czechoslovakian translator working for the CIA, and was arrested in 1977. During his interrogation, Ogorodnik offered to write a full confession and asked for his pen. When the interrogator handed him the pen with a cleverly hidden cyanide pill in the cap, Ogorodnik bit on it and died soon after. He was said to have died before he hit the floor.

He died without knowing the existence of his daughter, Alejandra Suárez Barcala, that was born from his romance in Bogota with a Spanish woman, Pilar Suárez Barcala, who helped CIA in Ogorodnik’s recruitment.

References

Bibliography 
 
 
 

1939 births
1977 suicides
American spies against the Soviet Union
Soviet diplomats
Spies who died in prison custody
Suicides by cyanide poisoning
Suicides in the Soviet Union